Danny Kamekona (November 15, 1935 – May 2, 1996) was an American actor.

Television and movie career
Kamekona began his acting career on television, debuting in a 1968 episode of Hawaii Five-O, one of 32 different appearances over 11 years. Other TV appearances included The Brian Keith Show; Sanford and Son; Barnaby Jones; six episodes of Magnum, P.I.; 21 Jump Street; L.A. Law; Walker, Texas Ranger; and his last TV appearance, in 1995's Burke's Law.  He appeared as Agawa, employed by Riochi Tanaka in the episode "The Rising Sun Of Death" of the series Miami Vice.

The Karate Kid Part II was Kamekona's debut movie appearance in 1986. Other movie appearances included Black Widow (with Terry O'Quinn), Problem Child (with Michael Richards), Honeymoon in Vegas, and his final movie appearance, 1993's Robot Wars.

Personal Appearances 
Actor participant in brief training scene re-enactment during PR tour of trilogy (April 23rd 1989), besides the Rose Theatre Shakespearian event day, accompanied by many of The Karate Kid Part II cast members, and was a featured character during the tributes to Magnum, P.I.''

Death
Kamekona was found dead in his Los Angeles, California apartment on May 2, 1996 at age 60. He had been dead for several days in his bathroom, according to friends and family members. The cause of death was never revealed.

Filmography

Film

Television

References

External links
 
 

1935 births
1996 deaths
American male television actors
American male film actors
20th-century American male actors
American male actors of Japanese descent
American film actors of Asian descent